Several ancient cities of Mesopotamia and Persia are known to have had a circular plan.

List of circular cities

See also
 Iranian architecture#City design

References

Lists of cities
City plans
History of urban planning
Architecture in Iran